Captain Joshua Fisher (February 4, 1675 - March 11, 1730) represented Dedham, Massachusetts in the Great and General Court in 1725 and 1726.

Personal life
Fisher was born February 4, 1675, to Joshua and Esther Fisher.

He married Hannah Gay in 1695. They had five daughters, Hannah, Mary, Rebecca, Judith, and Sarah. Mary married Nathaniel Ames.

He died March 11, 1730.

Career
He inherited Fisher's Tavern from his father, Joshua. It was founded by his grandfather, also named Lieutenant Joshua Fisher. Upon his death he left it to his widow.

References

Works cited

Businesspeople from Dedham, Massachusetts
Members of the colonial Massachusetts General Court from Dedham
1675 births
1730 deaths